Doctor is a 2021 Indian Tamil-language action comedy film written and directed by Nelson. The film stars Sivakarthikeyan who also produced it under his banner Sivakarthikeyan Productions, whereas KJR Studios served as the co-producer and distributor. The film also stars  Vinay Rai and Priyanka Arul Mohan, while Yogi Babu, Milind Soman, Redin Kingsley, Archana Chandhoke and Deepa Shankar appear in supporting roles. 

The music is composed by Anirudh Ravichander with cinematography performed by Vijay Kartik Kannan and editing by R. Nirmal. Doctor was released in theatres on 9 October 2021, following multiple delays related to the COVID-19 pandemic. The film received positive reviews from critics who praised the black comedy, direction, writing, performances (particularly Sivakarthikeyan and Vinay Rai), soundtrack, musical score and cinematography and grossed 100 crores in worldwide box office and became a major critical and commercial success.

Plot 
Varun, a military doctor working in the Indian Army Medical Corps is a strict and practical person. While returning home from an operation, he receives a voicemail from his fiancée, Padmini,  who urges him to call off their upcoming wedding. While enquiring about her sudden change-of-decision with her family. Padmini belittles him for being emotionally distant and apathetic. While leaving, Varun and Padmini's family learns that Chinnu, Padmini's niece, has gone missing. The family lodges a complaint with the police – which in turn appoints Bhagat, a low-ranking police officer, to monitor the family's communications. 

Disillusioned with the police's sluggish progress, Varun plots to kidnap the ACP's daughter, believing that the resulting investigation would be more competent. His plan works, and the police nab almost every major criminal related to child-kidnapping. Varun singles out three criminals (Kamala Kannan, Kamesh, and Prathap), noticing that they were present around Chinnu's school at the time of her disappearance. Varun sedates them, and interrogates them by blackmailing them with their kidneys that he had apparently removed. Kamala Kannan confesses to kidnapping Chinnu and handing her over to a child-trafficking network. Varun recruits Pratap and two other gangsters, Mahaali and Killi, to assist in his investigation. 

Varun's search leads him to twins Alvin and Melvin, both of whom are responsible for child-trafficking and prostitution. Varun and Padmini's family confront the duo inside a Chennai Metro train, and succeed in separating the duo and abducting Alvin. Desperate to save Alvin, Melvin concedes to release only one girl from his group of kidnapped girls. Although Chinnu is among them, Varun demands Melvin to release all the girls, despite Padmini's objections. Melvin refuses, but hints that the girls are being taken to Goa. Varun, Pratap, Mahaali, Killi and Padmini's family follow Melvin to Goa, where they discover that the true mastermind behind the recent kidnappings is Terry, the owner of a high-end resort. 

Varun orchestrates a drama, in which he has Mahaali, Killi Padmini act as if the duo were kidnapping her and simultaneously has Padmini's family urge Terry to find her. As per his plan, Terry traces Padmini's kidnapping down to Varun, who poses as a child-trafficker masquerading as the owner of an ice-cream parlour. Varun demands Terry to give a girl to him, as compensation for saving Padmini. Unbeknownst to Terry, Varun had arranged for his friend, Colonel James Anderson and his team of commandos to apprehend Terry. Terry escorts Varun to his base of operations, located on a remote island. Varun discovers than Terry's victims are primarily underage girls. Realising that any action would endanger the kidnapped victims' and Chinnu's lives, Varun calls off the operation despite James' protests. 

Determined to save the girls' lives, Varun initiates his backup plan. He negotiates a deal with Terry and Terry's father to ship a consignment of 40 girls to Don Pablo El-Fino– a fictitious Brazilian child-trafficking's boss (actually Varun's father in disguise). Concurrently, Terry organises a meeting with his associates to discuss the upcoming deal; Melvin is among those in attendance. Varun discreetly orders Melvin to kill Terry; the latter's attempt to do so is surprisingly thwarted by Varun himself (in order to gain Terry's trust). Terry interrogates Melvin, learning about Alvin's abduction and that Melvin's actions were purely out of desperation. Unwilling to reveal the identity of Alvin's abductor, Melvin is killed by Terry. Later, while going through the family profiles of the twins's latest kidnaps, Terry discovers Padmini's family is among them and deduces Varun's plan. 

Terry later has Varun and the family apprehended and takes them to his island, intending to kill them. However, Alvin appears, seeking revenge for Melvin's death. Alvin reveals he had abducted Terry's father and agrees to spare him, in return for letting Varun and the family along with all the other girls leave. After they leave, Alvin kills Terry's father to avenge Melvin's death, where Terry kills him in retribution. Elsewhere, Varun realises that he had left a girl behind and returns to the island alone. Terry apprehends Varun and plans to kill the lone girl in front of him, but is thwarted by James's team and Bhagat, who had infiltrated his base. Varun escorts the girl to safety while James's team kill Terry and his henchmen. 3 months later, Padmini reconciles with Varun and they get married in presence of their family and friends.

Cast

Production

Development 
On 20 August 2019, sources claimed that Sivakarthikeyan had signed a new project, with his close friend Nelson Dilipkumar, after directing Kolamavu Kokila (2018). It was initially slated to be produced by the Indian branch of Sony Pictures in their maiden production in Tamil, along with Vishnu Vardhan Induri's production banner, Vibri Media and Entertainment. Anirudh Ravichander was roped in to score music for the film, marking his sixth collaboration with Sivakarthikeyan, and the project was reported to be kickstarted in late 2019, only after the completion of Sivakarthikeyan's commitments in other projects. In a turn of events, both the producers opted out of the project, and Sivakarthikeyan was reported to be producing the film under his own banner Sivakarthikeyan Productions, whilst KJR Studios was being roped in as the co-producers. On 2 December 2019, Sivakarthikeyan unveiled the title of the film as Doctor. The first look which released on 17 February 2020 (Sivakarthikeyan's birthday) was noted for its resemblance to a poster of Dhanush's shelved project Doctors.

Casting 
In November 2019, Kavin was reported to be a part of the film's cast, but no official confirmation being revealed from the producer's side. In December 2019, sources claimed that Priyanka Arul Mohan will be seen opposite Sivakarthikeyan, in a leading role, marking her debut in Tamil cinema. Vinay Rai and Yogi Babu also joined the cast within the same month, with the former playing the antagonist. Archana Chandhoke was reported to a be part of the film. Vineet and Ilavarasu. Sivakarthikeyan was reported to have shed some kilos for his role in the film. Bollywood actors and brothers Raghu Ram and Rajiv Lakshman were also roped in for antagonistic roles, making their Tamil debut.

Filming 
The film was launched on 29 November 2019, with a puja ceremony in Chennai, followed by principal shoot. On 6 January 2020, the makers wrapped the first schedule of the film, and kickstarted the second schedule of the film. As reports stated, the makers planned to shoot one half of the film in Chennai, and the other half in Goa. On 12 February 2020, Sivakarthikeyan and Nelson went for a recce in Goa, to scout the locations for shoot. The second schedule commenced in Goa, officially on 14 February 2020, and was shot for 14 days, before completing it on 28 February 2020. The film's shoot got halted due to the COVID-19 pandemic in India and nationwide lockdown, with 80% of the film's shoot been completed, as of May 2020.

On 15 September, it was reported that the makers planned to resume the shoot later this month in Chennai, with a final schedule and few talkie portions were expected to be wrapped up within a single stretch of 12 days. The shoot was later resumed in 26 September, with minimal crew adhering to government rules and regulations. A special team was designated to observe the film crew, including the director and actor, were abiding the COVID-19 protocol. The final portions of the film, including one song was expected to be completed as of November 2020. The principal shooting of the film was completed on 3 January 2021.

Post-production 
The post-production process of the film officially began on 11 May 2020, after the government granted permission to resume post-production works of Tamil films. The editing works of the film have been resumed during the process. On 17 September, the makers started the dubbing of the film, with a traditional puja ceremony. Archana Chandhoke started dubbing for the film, during the process. Sivakarthikeyan completed the dubbing portions of the film on 1 February 2021, thus post-production works were completed.

Music 

The film's soundtrack album is composed by Anirudh Ravichander, in his sixth collaboration with Sivakarthikeyan, and second collaboration with Nelson Dilipkumar. In February 2020, Sony Music India secured the film's audio rights. The film's first single "Chellamma" was composed during the lockdown. The song was penned by Sivakarthikeyan himself, which had lines about TikTok being banned in India, and was sung by Anirudh and Jonita Gandhi. It was released on 16 July 2020, and the song went viral upon its release, crossing 130 million views as of November 2021.

The second single "Nenjame" was released on 28 August 2020. It features a promotional video, directed by Nelson himself, featuring Sivakarthikeyan and Priyanka Arul Mohan, shot in monochrome by cinematographer Vijay Kartik Kannan. It was reported that the song will be featured as a montage in the film. The third single "So Baby" was released on 26 February 2021, and is a "classical-western" fusion song. The last single "Soul Of Doctor" was released on 28 September 2021 and sung by Niranjana Ramanan.

Release

Theatrical 
The film was released theatrically on 9 October 2021, worldwide. Apart from Tamil, the film will be dubbed and released in Telugu under the title Varun Doctor. Initially scheduled for a theatrical release in late 2020, the film was postponed as shooting and post-production processes came to halt due to the lockdown. In November 2020, the makers announced for a theatrical release during April 2021, refuting rumours of a digital release.

The makers announced that the film would be released on 26 March 2021, but later postponed due to the 2021 Tamil Nadu Legislative Assembly election taking place in April. Later the makers announced that the film will be scheduled to release in Eid on 13 May 2021. As of June 2021, the release date of the film has been postponed indefinitely due to rise in COVID-19 cases and state lockdown in Tamil Nadu.

Home media 
The satellite rights of this film was sold to Sun TV Network and digital rights was sold to Netflix and Sun NXT. The film had its digital premiere in Netflix on 5 November 2022. The Hindi dubbed version was directly premiered on Goldmines TV channel on 15 October 2022.

Reception

Box office 
The film is the third highest grossing Tamil film of 2021 behind Master and  Annaatthe along with   Maanaadu. The movie had collected ₹100 crores in 25 days, becoming the first movie of Sivakarthikeyan to achieve the feat. The movie had a phenomenal run in the USA market, where the movie collections had surpassed the collections of Vijay's Master.

Critical response 
Doctor received positive reviews from critics who praised the black comedy, direction, writing, performances (particularly Sivakarthikeyan and Vinay Rai), soundtrack, musical score and cinematography.

M Suganth of The Times of India gave the film four stars out of five writing, "And all along, the writing remains solid, giving us situations that might have felt implausible in a serious film but work brilliantly because of the black comedy." Behindwoods gave the film three stars out of five while writing, "Overall, Nelson sticks to his strengths and delivers a laughter riot. Here the humour provides the shield for all the weaknesses the film has. Nelson and SK succeed in delivering an engaging and entertaining film, and the former has also etched a space for himself, making him a director to look out for in the future." The Hindu wrote, "With his earlier film Kolamavu Kokila, the filmmaker proved that he could captivate audiences with the story of an ordinary family doing extraordinary things. He repeats the same trope in this outing, and the result: an intriguing tale of a family going to great lengths, to save a loved one." Hindustan Times wrote, "Sivakarthikeyan's new film is unlike any you've seen him in before. With dark humour, Nelson adds spice to a mundane script". Indiaglitz gave the film 3 out of 5 writing "Go for this laugh out loud delightful dark comedy with quirky characters galore." Business standard    gave the film a positive review writing "Like Lokesh Kanagaraj, Nelson too promises a bright future for Tamil cinema. The Tarantino-esque absurdity that he brings to the table sans pareil in Indian cinema at the moment."

References

External links 
 

2021 action comedy films
2021 black comedy films
2021 films
Films scored by Anirudh Ravichander
Films shot in Goa
Indian action comedy films
Indian black comedy films
Medical-themed films
2020s Tamil-language films
Films directed by Nelson (director)